This is a list of French units in the American Revolutionary War.  Other battalions and regiment served on marine/naval service, but can be viewed on their own articles.

American Service 
Those units which served on the American Continent (not naval) included:

 1ére Légion (Volontaires Étrangers de la Marine) — also saw service in the Caribbean
 2éme Legion (Légion de Lauzun) — Cavalry and Infantry
 Infantry
Régiment d'Armagnac
Régiment de Bourbonnais
Régiment de Soissonnais
Régiment de Royal-Deux-Ponts
Saintonge Regiment
Régiment d'Agénois
Régiment de Gâtinais
Régiment de Touraine
Régiment d'Hainault (2nd Battalion)
Régiment de Foix (2nd Battalion)
Régiment de Dillon
Régiment de Walsh
 Régiment de Guadeloupe — also saw service in French Antilles
 Artillery
 Régiment d'Auxonne (2nd Battalion)
 Régiment de Metz (2nd Battalion)
 Company from Régiment de Grenoble

Caribbean Service 
Those units which fought in the Caribbean included:

 Régiment d'Armagnac
 Volontaires Libres (served in Guadeloupe and Martinique)
 1ére Légion, Volontaires Étrangers de la Marine (also saw service in the States)
 Cannoniers Bombardiers (served in Saint-Domingue, Martinique, and Guadeloupe)
 Garrison of Guadeloupe Garnison de Guadeloupe
 Régiment de Guadeloupe located in Guadeloupe (also saw service in French Antilles and the States)
 Corps de Travailleurs
 Garrison of Saint-Dominque Garnison de Saint-Dominique
 Régiment du Cap
 Régiment de Port-au-Prince
 Greandiers Volontaires
 Chasseurs Royaux
 Chasseurs Volontaires
 Garrison of Martinique Garnison de Martinique
 Régiment de Martinique
 Volontaires de Bouille
 Cadets de Saint-Pierre
 Cadets du Gros-Morne

References 

 Louis Susane, Histoire de L'Ancienne Infanterie Française, Volumes II, III, IV, V, VI, VII, and VIII, Military Library, Maritime and Polytechnic, Paris, France.
 Ministry of Foreign Affairs, Les Combattants Français de la Guerre Américaine 1778–1783, 1903 Paris, France.
 Digby Smith, Kevin E. Kiley, and Jeremy Black, An Illustrated Encyclopedia of Uniforms of the American War of Independence, 2017 Lorenz Books, London, United Kingdom. .

 
American Revolutionary War
American Revolution-related lists
American Revolutionary War